Leán Coetzer (born 1969) is a South African dancer and choreographer. Her dance career officially began as founder member of the PACT Dance Company in 1988.  Since then, Coetzer has performed and choreographed around South Africa, including the creation of several performance art pieces in various exhibitions and festivals. She works as a Voice Movement Therapy Practitioner.

Education
Coetzer studied at the Pretoria school for Art, Ballet and Music, where she concentrated in ballet. She has been trained in the Royal Academy of Dance style and passed the advanced level in Classical Ballet and the intermediate level in Modern Dance. In 2014 she qualified as a Voice Movement Therapy Practitioner through the IAVMT, International Association for Voice Movement Therapy.

Career

Exhibitions
 Kingdom exhibition at Equus Gallery on Cavalli Estate, 2015 
 Darling Voorkamerfest, 2014
 Pieces and Puzzles at the Lovell Gallery, 2013
 Infecting the City, 2012

 Angels, Grand Provence, Franschhoek 2011 
 Spier Contemporary, 2010
 Mullineux Cellar, Riebeek-Kasteel, 2010
 Deveron Arts, Scotland, 2008

Dance Experience
1988 -1991: Founder and Choreographer of the PACT (Performing Arts Council Transvaal) Dance Company
 1992: Performed with the John Felter group
 1992 - 1994: Principal dancer in the Bophuthatswana Dance Company under direction of David Krugel.
 2002: Solo dance performance at FNB Dance Umbrella
 1998 - 2002 Theatre of the Messiah (TOM) dance company
 Grahamstown National Arts Festival 2012
A Boat Called "Me" - Solo Performance at Darling Voorkamerfest 2014

Community Festival Project 
"Die Locals is Lekker" was initiated in 2010 by Leán Coetzer in Riebeek Kasteel. It is a celebration and promotion of local performing artists and groups from the Swartland area.

Regular performances were staged from 2010 until 2015 in Riebeek Kasteel.

References

External links
 Performance art: http://www.leancoetzer.co.za/
 Dance: http://www.leancoetzer.co.za/dance.htm
 Infecting the City: https://www.flickr.com/photos/infectingthecity/6845918389/
 Voice Movement Therapy: http://www.bodysong.co.za/
 "Die Locals is Lekker"  http://www.bodysong.co.za/locals
 Art of Presenting: www.artofpresenting.com

1969 births
Living people